"Hearts on Fire" is a song by Australian electronic music band Cut Copy, released in 2007 as the lead single from their second studio album, In Ghost Colours (2008). The song's chorus contains a small vocal sample from Jennifer Lopez's "Waiting for Tonight". A re-edited version of the song, produced by Tim Goldsworthy, was released on 5 July 2008 and served as the album version. Pitchfork Media named "Hearts on Fire" the seventh best track of 2008.

Music video
The music video, directed by Nagi Noda and shot on location in Japan, portrays a lovelorn frontman Dan Whitford suffering from a breakup. He is constantly followed by a rainy cloud hanging over his head, which represents his sadness. After time goes by (demonstrated by the growth of his dog), he finally lets go of the pain and continues his life without the rain following him, until the very end of the video during which he runs into his ex-girlfriend, causing the rain to resume.

Track listings
Australian iTunes EP (2007)
"Hearts on Fire" – 5:36
"Hearts on Fire" (Joakim Remix) – 8:54

Australian 12" single
A. "Hearts on Fire" – 5:32
B. "Hearts on Fire" (Joakim Remix) – 8:51

Australian and UK CD single
"Hearts on Fire" (Radio Edit) – 3:40
"Hearts on Fire" (Calvin Harris Remix) – 5:39
"Hearts on Fire" (Midnight Juggernauts Remix) – 4:30
"Hearts on Fire" (Knightlife Remix) – 4:24
"Hearts on Fire" (video)

Australian iTunes EP (2008)
"Hearts on Fire" – 4:52
"Hearts on Fire" (Calvin Harris Remix) – 5:39
"Hearts on Fire" (Midnight Juggernauts Remix) – 4:30
"Hearts on Fire" (Knightlife Remix) – 4:24
"Hearts on Fire" (J.P. Shilo Version) – 5:39

UK iTunes EP
"Hearts on Fire" – 4:54
"Hearts on Fire" (Radio Edit) – 3:38
"Hearts on Fire" (Calvin Harris Remix) – 5:39
"Hearts on Fire" (Midnight Juggernauts Remix) – 4:30
"Hearts on Fire" (Knightlife Remix) – 4:24
"Hearts on Fire" (Holy Ghost! Remix) – 8:34
"Hearts on Fire" (JP Shilo Version) – 5:37

UK 12" single
A1. "Hearts on Fire" (Full Length) – 4:52
A2. "Hearts on Fire" (Calvin Harris Remix) – 5:39
B1. "Hearts on Fire" (Midnight Juggernauts) – 4:30
B2. "Hearts on Fire" (Holy Ghost! Remix) – 8:34

Personnel
Credits adapted from CD single liner notes.

 Cut Copy – production
 Alter – artwork, layout
 John Fields - mixing 
 Tim Goldsworthy – production 
 Nilesh Patel – mastering

Charts

Release history

References

2007 singles
2007 songs
Cut Copy songs
Modular Recordings singles